The Independent Social Democratic Party (FSZDP), was a short-lived political party in Hungary, existed between 1989 and 1993.

History
The FSZDP was founded by lawyer György Ruttner and his approximately fifty followers, who had formerly left the Hungarian Social Democratic Party (MSZDP) during its congress in November 1989, referring to disagreements with the leadership. Also prominent member were Ferenc Kitzinger, Pál Benyó, Szilárd Nyakas, Alfréd Sinkovics and Dezső Guba. Former MSZDP leader András Révész was elected leader of the new party. During its formation, two Members of Parliament also joined the party.

In January 1990, it became a member of the Hungarian Round Table Talks. Before the 1990 parliamentary election, the FSZDP concluded an electoral alliance with the Hungarian People's Party (MNP). The FSZDP had five individual candidates during the election and received 0.15 percent of the votes, gaining no seats. As a result, Ruttner, who already ran as a non-partisan candidate, decided to left the party. The new leadership under Dezső Guba joined the MSZDP's efforts to restoration of the Social Democrat unity. Just before the 1994 parliamentary election, the FSZDP and the Social Democrat People's Party (SZDNP) re-merged into the MSZDP in October 1993.

Election results

National Assembly

References

Sources

1989 establishments in Hungary
1993 disestablishments in Hungary
Defunct political parties in Hungary
Political parties disestablished in 1993
Political parties established in 1989
Social democratic parties in Hungary
Social Democratic Party of Hungary